The Samsung N130 is a subnotebook/netbook computer designed by Samsung. At the time of its introduction, it was noted for a good keyboard, large 6-cell battery as standard, giving a battery life of up to 7.5 hours a medium 160gb SATA hard disk drive and a release price of 349 USD.

Technical overview

Processor and memory

The Samsung N130 uses a 1.6 GHz Intel Atom N270 processor. The N130 has 1 GB of 200-pin PC2-6400 800MHz DDR2 SDRAM memory as standard. Internally, the N130 has one slot for memory accepting SO-DIMM memory modules up to 2 GB.

Display

The screen is a non-glossy LED backlit display and measures 10.1 inches diagonally, and has a resolution of 1024×600 pixels. An external VGA out is also included.

Keyboard

As with earlier models, the 83-key keyboard is 93% of the size of a full-size keyboard, which makes typing quite easy on the netbook. The keyboard is made with Silver Nano (Anti-Bacterial) technology.

Storage

The standard internal hard drive size is 160 GB. It also includes an SD card slot, supporting MMC, SD and SDHC cards for additional storage as a standard features of this netbook series.

Operating systems
The N130 is shipped either with Windows XP Home Edition, Windows Vista Business or Windows 7 Starter. Linux (e.g. Ubuntu, Mandriva) distributions are also supported.

Colors and configurations
The N130 is available in different colors and configurations. Colors include white, black, blue and pink. The configurations may differ in the lack of Bluetooth, e.g. some models in German markets, the fitting of a UMTS/HSDPA module, a weaker battery.

The new model N140 is an upgrade of the basic N130 design, with modified touchpad, Bluetooth 2.0+EDR (standard configuration) and improved styling.

Criticism  
Some users noticed a keyboard typing problem because the placement of the Page up, Backspace and Page down keys was considered troublesome.

See also
 Comparison of netbooks

References

External links
 N130 official page
 Samsung N130 - Community Site

Netbooks
N130